Enrico D'Aniello (born 6 December 1995) is an Italian rowing cox. He competed in the men's eight event at the 2016 Summer Olympics. He has won various gold medals at World Rowing Championships.

Achievements

References

External links
 

1995 births
Living people
Italian male rowers
Olympic rowers of Italy
Rowers at the 2016 Summer Olympics
Place of birth missing (living people)
World Rowing Championships medalists for Italy
Coxswains (rowing)